Kébir Airport is an airstrip serving Ounianga, a town in the Ennedi-Ouest Region of northern Chad.

Facilities 

References 

Airports in Chad
Ennedi-Ouest Region